Brian Edward Gottfried (born January 27, 1952) is a retired American tennis player who won 25 singles titles and 54 doubles titles during his professional career. He was the runner-up in singles at the 1977 French Open, won the 1975 and 1977 French Open Doubles as well as the 1976 Wimbledon Doubles. He achieved a career-high singles ranking on the ATP tour on June 19, 1977, when he became world No. 3, and a career-high doubles ranking on December 12, 1976, when he became No. 2 .

Tennis career

Junior and college

Gottfried was born in Baltimore, Maryland, and is Jewish. He began playing tennis at the age of 5, after receiving a racquet as a gift. In all, Gottfried won 14 national junior titles. As a teen Gottfried attended Baylor School in Chattanooga, Tennessee, and Piper High School in Sunrise, Florida. In 1970, as a freshman at Trinity University in Texas, he won the USTA boys 18s singles championship, as well as the doubles championship with Alexander Mayer.  He was an All-American in 1971 and 1972.

Professional career

Gottfried began his professional tennis career in 1972.  He won five tournaments in 1977 and was runner-up at the French Open. Newsweek described him as the "best male tennis player in the world at the moment" in April 1977, while World Tennis and Tennis Magazine ranked him as No. 4 in their 1977's year-end rankings. He won the Italian Open doubles championship in four consecutive years (1974–77). He won the men's doubles at the French Open in 1975 and 1977. In 1976, he won the men's doubles title at Wimbledon. He ended his career tied for 22nd in open era singles titles leaders, and tied for 12th in doubles.

Arthur Ashe liked to recall how Gottfried missed his daily practice session to get married, but atoned by doubling his practice time the next day.

Gottfried retired as the player with the greatest number of tour match victories among players who had never won a grand slam. He held this record for 32 years, eventually being succeeded by David Ferrer. He was also second to Ferrer for most titles by a player who never won a major.

Grand Slam finals

Singles: 1 (1 runner-up)

Doubles: 7 (3 titles, 4 runners-up)

Grand Slam tournament performance timeline

Singles

Grand Prix, WCT, and Grand Slam finals

Singles: 51 (25 titles, 26 runner-ups)

Doubles (54 titles, 41 runner-ups)

Davis Cup
Gottfried was 7–7 in Davis Cup play for the US between 1975 and 1982 and won it twice (in 1978 and 1982).

Halls of Fame & awards
Gottfried won the 1974 and 1975 ATP Doubles Team of the Year Award with partner Raúl Ramírez.

He won the 1976 ATP Most Improved Player Award.

He won the ATP Sportsmanship award in 1984.

Gottfried was inducted into the Intercollegiate Tennis Association's Intercollegiate Tennis Hall of Fame in 1990.

Gottfried, who is Jewish, was inducted into the International Jewish Sports Hall of Fame in 1999.

Life after playing career

Gottfried now lives in Sarasota, Florida. In 2007 Gottfried joined the coaching staff at the Harold Solomon Tennis Institute in Fort Lauderdale.

In 2010, Gottfried coached with the Bollettieri Tennis Program at the IMG Academy in Bradenton, Florida.

He was elected to the ATP Player Council in 2012 as an alumni representative.

In 2015, he joined the coaching staff at the Bolles School

His younger brother, Larry was also a tennis player.

See also
List of select Jewish tennis players

References

External links
 
 
 

American male tennis players
French Open champions
Jewish American sportspeople
Jewish tennis players
Sportspeople from Baltimore
People from Ponte Vedra Beach, Florida

Tennis people from Maryland
Trinity Tigers men's tennis players
Wimbledon champions
American people of German-Jewish descent
1952 births
Living people
Grand Slam (tennis) champions in men's doubles
Piper High School (Florida) alumni
21st-century American Jews